The 2011 Thai floods occurred at the end of March 2011, normally the latter part of the dry season ( or  ) in tropical Thailand.

Impact
At least 53 people have died and almost nine million people have been affected by the floods after localized heavy rains The flooding has affected 50 of Thailand's 76 provinces. Around 5,000 households have been evacuated, in addition to hundreds of tourists. 
Nakhon Si Thammarat Province has been worst-affected, and a state of emergency was declared in several provinces.

Causes
The floods hit during a typically dry season, and were triggered when a record cold wave moved south from East Asia and produced persistent flooding in combination with near-normal sea surface temperatures, still warm enough to support strong convectional precipitation.

See also
2010 floods in Thailand and north Malaysia
2010 China floods
2011 Thai floods
2011 Southeast Asian floods
Floods in Thailand

References 

2011 floods in Asia
Floods in Thailand
2011 in Thailand
2011 disasters in Thailand